Mogotón is a mountain in the Reserva Nacional Cordillera Dipilto y Jalapa on the border of Nicaragua and Honduras.

External links
 The World Factbook
 Archived from http://www.cerromogotonnicaragua.dorosevich.com/gpage.html

Mountains of Nicaragua
Mountains of Honduras
International mountains of North America
Honduras–Nicaragua border
Highest points of countries